Jean-Pierre Moueix (20 August 1913 – 29 March 2003) was a French winemaker, the founder of Établissements Jean-Pierre Moueix.

References

1913 births
2003 deaths
French winemakers